Man of East is a 2008 Russian action film directed by Oleg Pogodin.

Plot 
The film tells about the special agent of Russian intelligence Egor Kremnev, who became a simple surveillance agent as a result of a series of professional failures. But on this his problems have only just begun.

Cast 
 Vladimir Epifantsev as Egor Kremnyov
 Sergey Astakhov as Shering
 Harry Borg as Pharmacist
 Graham Charles as Barman
 John-sebastien Cote as Harley
 Hristo Dimitrov as Clerk Heinz
 Dmitriy Dobuzhinskiy as Pyostrenkiy
 Alexander Drozhzhin as Head of assault team
 Yakov Efimov
 Olga Fadeeva as Nadezhda Orlova

References

External links 
 

2008 films
2000s Russian-language films
Russian action films
2008 action films
Films directed by Oleg Pogodin